Wolfermann, Wolferman, or Wolffermann are German-language surnames. Notable people with the surname include:

Ana Wolfermann
Klaus Wolfermann
 Ilan Wolfferman, birth name of Ilan Ramon
Stuart Wolferman, member of Imaginary Johnny, American indie-rock band

German-language surnames